Albert Edward Page (18 March 1916 – 1995) was an English professional footballer who played for Leyton, Tottenham Hotspur, Colchester United and Chingford Town.

Football career 
Page began his career at Leyton. In 1936 the centre half joined Tottenham Hotspur. Between 1936–1946, Page made 56 appearances in all competitions for the Lilywhites. After leaving White Hart Lane he played at Colchester United before ending his career at non League Chingford Town.

References

External links
A page in history
Albert Page @ Glory Glory

1916 births
1995 deaths
People from Walthamstow
English footballers
English Football League players
Tottenham Hotspur F.C. players
Colchester United F.C. players
Leyton F.C. players
Association football defenders